Alexander Stuart Wallace (December 30, 1810 – June 27, 1893) was a U.S. Representative from South Carolina.

The son of American colonial immigrant McCasland Wallace (born at sea on the Atlantic Ocean to a Scots-Irish family on their way to the port of Charleston, South Carolina), Wallace was born near York, South Carolina and received limited schooling. He engaged in planting in his native county.

He served as member of the State house of representatives from 1852 to 1855, from 1858 to 1859 under the Unionist banner.  When South Carolina seceded from the Union he withdrew from politics.  He quietly refrained from supporting the Confederacy in any way during the war years, though this was a situation he had to navigate carefully, as his earlier Unionist sympathies made him a target.  After the war he immediately joined the Republican Party. 
He successfully contested as a Republican the election of William D. Simpson to the Forty-first Congress.
South Carolina's 1868 Constitution barred ex-confederates from voting but did give the franchise to newly freed African-Americans.  As a result, most people eligible to vote in the next several elections were African-Americans, northern military officers who had stayed in South Carolina after the war, and whites who worked for the Freedmen's Bureau, all of whom overwhelmingly supported the Republican party.
Under these circumstances Wallace was reelected to the Forty-second, Forty-third, and Forty-fourth Congresses and served from May 27, 1870, to March 3, 1877.  
He served as chairman of the Committee on Revolutionary Claims (Forty-second Congress).
He was an unsuccessful candidate for reelection in 1876 to the Forty-fifth Congress.
He engaged in agricultural pursuits until his death near York, South Carolina, June 27, 1893.

He was interred at Rose Hill Cemetery in York.

Sources

External links
 Photograph from Library of Congress

1810 births
1893 deaths
Republican Party members of the United States House of Representatives from South Carolina
Republican Party members of the South Carolina House of Representatives
South Carolina Unionists
19th-century American politicians